The following lists events that happened during 1923 in South Africa.

Incumbents
 Monarch: King George V.
 Governor-General and High Commissioner for Southern Africa: 
 Prince Arthur of Connaught (until 5 December).
 Sir James Rose Innes (acting, from 5 December).
 Prime Minister: Jan Smuts.
 Chief Justice: Sir James Rose Innes.

Events
March
 1 – The Electricity Supply Commission (Eskom), largest electricity producer in Africa, is established.

Unknown date
 The South African Native National Congress changes its name to African National Congress.

Births
 10 April – John Watkins, cricketer (d. 2021)
 30 April – Francis Tucker, rally Driver. (d. 2008)
 19 May – Johannes Meintjes, artist and writer. (d. 1980)
 6 August – Moira Lister, South African-born English film, stage and television actress. (d. 2007)
 5 October – Glynis Johns, South African-born Welsh actress.
 11 October – Moses Mabhida, anti-apartheid activist. (d. 1986)
 11 November – Pieter van der Byl, politician (d. 1999)
 20 November – Nadine Gordimer, writer and political activist. (d. 2014)
 17 December – Wilton Mkwayi, anti-apartheid activist. (d. 2004)

Deaths

Railways

Railway lines opened
 12 April – Transvaal – Dunswart to Apex deviation, .
 21 May – Natal – Queen's Bridge to Duff's Road deviation, .
 8 July – Natal – Canelands, Umdloti to Maidstone deviation, .
 6 August – Cape – Kamfersdam to Winter's Rush, .
 9 August – Cape – Belmont to Douglas, .
 30 October – Transvaal – Settlers to Tuinplaas, .

Locomotives
 The New Cape Central Railway places two 2-6-2+2-6-2 Double Prairie type Garratt articulated steam locomotives in service. They will be designated Class GK on the South African Railways (SAR) in 1925.
 Major Frank Dutton, SAR Signal Engineer and the Motor Transport Superintendent, conducts trials with a prototype petrol-paraffin powered Dutton road-rail tractor.
 Mr. C. Lawson, Superintendent Mechanical of the SAR, experiments with gas-electric motive power and constructs a single experimental producer gas-electric locomotive. The locomotive remains in service for several years but the gas-electric concept will eventually be superseded by diesel-electric traction.

References

South Africa
Years in South Africa
History of South Africa